Lordithon is a genus of beetles belonging to the family Staphylinidae.

The species of this genus are found in Eurasia, America, Australia.

Species:
 Lordithon abditus Herman, 2001
 Lordithon affinis (Cameron, 1950)
 Lordithon lunulatus

References

Staphylinidae
Staphylinidae genera